The 9th NRJ Music Awards took place in Cannes, France, on January 26, 2008.

Nominees/winners

Francophone Revelation of the Year
Christophe Willem
Justice
Melissa M
Vitaa
Yael Naïm

International Revelation of the Year
Amy Winehouse
Fall Out Boy
MIKA
Plain White T's
Sean Kingston

Francophone Female Artist of the Year
Amel Bent
Céline Dion
Jenifer
Shy'm
Zazie

International Female Artist of the Year
Alicia Keys
Avril Lavigne
Fergie
Nelly Furtado
Rihanna

Francophone Male Artist of the Year
Calogero
Christophe Maé
David Guetta
Emmanuel Moire
MC Solaar

International Male Artist of the Year
Akon
James Blunt
Juanes
Justin Timberlake
Timbaland

Francophone Group/Duo of the Year
Diams / Vitaa
Fatal Bazooka
I Am
Magic System
Superbus

International Group/Duo of the Year
50 Cent / Justin Timberlake
Linkin Park
Maroon 5
P.Diddy  / Keyshia Cole
Tokio Hotel

International Song of the Year
James Blunt - "1973"
Mika - "Relax, Take It Easy"
Rihanna - "Don't Stop the Music"
Sean Kingston - "Beautiful Girls"
Timbaland - "The Way I Are"

Francophone Album of the Year
Bob Sinclar - Soundz of Freedom
Christophe Maé - Mon Paradis
Christophe Willem - Inventaire
David Guetta - Pop Life
Vanessa Paradis - Divine Idylle

International Album of the Year 
Amy Winehouse - Back to Black
Britney Spears - Blackout
James Blunt - All the Lost Souls
Mika - Life in Cartoon Motion
Rihanna - Good Girl Gone Bad

Music Video of the Year 
50 Cent and Justin Timberlake - "Ayo Technology"
Calogero - "Pomme C"
Fatal Bazooka - "Parle à ma main"
Justice - "D.A.N.C.E."
Mika - "Relax, Take It Easy"

References
Official website

NRJ